Road Kill, known as Road Train in Australia, is a 2010 Australian horror film directed by Dean Francis and written by Clive Hopkins. It stars Xavier Samuel, Bobby Morley, Georgina Haig and Sophie Lowe.

Plot 
Marcus (Xavier Samuel), his best friend Craig (Bobby Morley), and their friends, Liz (Georgina Haig) and Nina (Sophie Lowe) are driving through the Australian outback, when a road train comes up behind their Jeep Cherokee and pushes them off the road, breaking Craig's arm. The truck stops some distance up the road. The group approaches it, but the driver is nowhere to be found. Distant gunshots are heard, and a crazed figure in the bush screams and runs towards them. Panicked, they commandeer the truck and drive away. The truck's radio turns on by itself. After all four fall asleep, the truck drives itself off the road and up a hill. When they wake up, Nina looks after Craig while Liz leaves to search for a shack she's seen. Unable to start the truck, Marcus accompanies Liz.

Nina discovers the truck's fuel tanks are empty, but finds a large pipe underneath the trailer, filled with a mysterious red fluid. Craig, tormented by visions of the hellhound Cerberus, finds a key to the trailers. He opens and enters the rearmost trailer, only for the door to close itself behind him. Marcus and Liz have a disagreement over her having slept with Craig, causing Liz to storm off. Marcus stays on the road and has a run-in with the truck's driver, who shoots himself. Liz locates the rundown shack, where she finds unlabeled cans containing the red fluid. Thirsty, she drinks some but quickly runs back to the truck after finding bloody remains.

Liz and Nina try to start the truck, but Marcus, now bearing the driver's clothes and gun, tries to destroy it. The women overpower and tie him up. Craig emerges from the trailer and kills Marcus. The truck starts up again, and Nina tries to back it up. Liz stands at the rear to signal Nina, but eventually leaves to drink more red fluid. Nina, unable to see Liz, exits the cab and sees Craig, who tries to lure her into the rear trailer. Hearing Liz crying for help from inside, she pushes Craig in and locks the door. Eventually, after Nina turns the truck around, she stops and examines the front trailer. To her horror, she discovers it is an abattoir where human bodies, including Marcus's, are ground into the red fluid that fuels the truck. Shocked, she returns to the cab and keeps driving.

Nina spots a car and signals them for help. The truck radio turns on again, distracting Nina long enough to allow Craig and Liz to break into the cab. As the three fight, Craig rams the truck into the car. Liz is thrown from the cab by Nina, who is then knocked out. When Nina awakens, she finds Craig dragging Liz's body to the trailer. He tries to persuade her to help, rambling of a "magnificent opportunity". Nina instead flees, but Craig slams her head on the side of the cab. He drags her into the trailer, but she manages to defend herself and flees into the bush. Craig pursues and catches Nina, but she kills him with the truck driver's gun. As Nina emerges from the bush, she spots the couple from the wrecked car examining the truck. She runs toward them, screaming warnings. The couple, having been run off the road, hearing distant gunshots, and seeing a screaming figure running towards them, commandeer the truck and drive off, leaving Nina to watch in horror as the bloody cycle repeats itself.

Cast
 Xavier Samuel as Marcus
 Bob Morley as Craig
 Sophie Lowe as Nina
 Georgina Haig as Liz

Production
Road Kill was shot in Adelaide, South Australia and Flinders Ranges. Michael Robertson produced the film for ProdigyMovies, Screen Australia and The South Australian Film Corporation.

Release 
The film premiered at the Dungog Film Festival. Road Train was re-titled in the US as Road Kill. The US premiere had the film as part of the Fangoria Fright Fest on 22 June 2010. It is set to be released by Lightning Entertainment on 6 August 2010 in the United States via DVD, Video on Demand and Digital download. The film was released in the United Kingdom on 30 August 2010.

Reception 

In a negative review, Dread Central wrote, "Despite a promising beginning with potentially interesting characters and a creepy, intimidating concept (a sinister road train), Road Kill squanders its potential by hurling itself off the rails, descending into rank absurdity." The Australian was more positive, comparing it to an early Steven Spielberg film, Duel, and noting the promise of the filmmakers.

Soundtrack 
The score was composed by Australian filmmusic artist Rafael May.

See also 
 Cinema of Australia
 Upír z Feratu and Blood Car, two films about cars that use blood for fuel
 Blood Drive, a TV series centered on a road race with cars that use blood for fuel

References

External links 
 
 

2010 films
2010 horror films
APRA Award winners
Australian horror films
Australian thriller films
Films set in abandoned houses
Films set in Australia
Films shot in Flinders Ranges
2010s supernatural horror films
Trucker films
2010s English-language films